WRMN (1410 AM) is an American radio station licensed to serve the community of Elgin, Illinois. The station's broadcast license is held by Elgin Community Broadcasting LLC.

The station was assigned the call sign "WRMN" by the Federal Communications Commission (FCC).
In August 2019, WRMN signed-on FM translator station W244EJ on 96.7 MHz.

Programming
WRMN broadcasts a news/talk radio format to the Fox Valley area in the northwest suburbs of Chicago, Illinois. , local programming includes The Morning Wakeup Call and The Radio Shopping Show on weekdays plus broadcasts of church services on Sunday mornings. Syndicated programs include various Talk Radio Network shows. Starting with the 2012 season, WRMN is the flagship station for the Schaumburg Boomers of minor league baseball's Frontier League.

Sale
An agreement was signed October 26, 2016 to sell WRMN, along with commonly-owned stations KSHP and WBIG, to Pollack Broadcasting for $2 million. The sale was consummated on January 31, 2017.

References

External links
WRMN official website

Radio stations in Illinois
News and talk radio stations in the United States
Elgin, Illinois
Kane County, Illinois
Radio stations established in 1969
1969 establishments in Illinois